Cymbiola is a genus of large predatory sea snail, a marine gastropod mollusk in the family Volutidae, the volutes.

Some of the species within this genus are sometimes placed in the genus Cymbiolacca Iredale, 1929, which is also sometimes treated as a subgenus of Cymbiola.

Species
Species within the genus Cymbiola include:
 Cymbiola alexisallaryi (Cossignani, 2018)
 † Cymbiola ambugensis (Harzhauser, Raven & Landau, 2018)
 Cymbiola aulica (Sowerby I, 1825)
 Cymbiola baili (Prati & Raybaudi, 1997)
 Cymbiola cathcartiae (Reeve, 1856)
 Cymbiola chrysostoma (Swainson, 1824)
 Cymbiola complexa (Iredale, 1924)
 Cymbiola cracenta (McMichael, 1963)
 Cymbiola cymbiola (Gmelin, 1791)
 Cymbiola deshayesi (Reeve, 1854)
 Cymbiola flavicans (Gmelin, 1791)
 † Cymbiola gedinganensis (K. Martin, 1895) 
 Cymbiola houarti (Bail & Limpus, 1998)
 Cymbiola hughmorrisoni (Bail & Limpus, 1997)
 Cymbiola imperialis (Lightfoot, 1786)
 Cymbiola innexa (Reeve, 1849)
 Cymbiola intruderi (Poppe, 1985)
 Cymbiola irvinae (Smith, 1909)
 Cymbiola kimbacki (Bail & Limpus, 2014)
 Cymbiola laminusa (Poppe, Tagaro & Bail, 2011)
 Cymbiola magnifica (Gebauer, 1802)
 Cymbiola malayensis (Douté & Bail, 2000)
 Cymbiola mariaemma (Gray, 1858)
 † Cymbiola molengraaffi (Cox, 1948) 
 † Cymbiola monocoronata (P. J. Fischer, 1927) 
 Cymbiola moretonensis (Bail & Limpus, 1998)
 † Cymbiola multiplicata (Pannekoek, 1936) 
 Cymbiola nivosa (Lamarck, 1804)
 Cymbiola nobilis (Lightfoot, 1786)
 Cymbiola palawanica (Douté & Bail, 2000)
 Cymbiola perplicata (Hedley, 1902)
 Cymbiola provocationis (McMichael, 1961)
 Cymbiola pulchra = Cymbiolacca pulchra, see Cymbiolacca pulchra wisemani
 † Cymbiola rembangensis (Pannekoek, 1936) 
 Cymbiola rossiniana (Bernardi, 1859)
 Cymbiola rutila (Broderip, 1826)
 Cymbiola scottjordani (Poppe & Tagaro, 2005)
 Cymbiola sophia (Gray, 1846) 
 Cymbiola subelongata (Bail & Limpus, 1998)
 Cymbiola thatcheri (McCoy, 1868)
 † Cymbiola tjilonganensis (K. Martin, 1906) 
 † Cymbiola transverseplicata (Pannekoek, 1936) 
 Cymbiola vespertilio (Linnaeus, 1758)
Species brought into synonymy
 Cymbiola complexa Iredale, 1924: synonym of Cymbiola (Cymbiolacca) pulchra complexa Iredale, 1924 
 Cymbiola excelsior Bail & Limpus, 1998: synonym of Cymbiola pulchra excelsior Bail & Limpus, 1998 (original rank)
 Cymbiola lutea R. B. Watson, 1882 : synonym of Alcithoe lutea (R. B. Watson, 1882) (original combination)
 Cymbiola marispuma Angioy & Biraghi, 1977: synonym of Cymbiola (Cymbiola) innexa (Reeve, 1849) 
 Cymbiola randalli Stokes, 1961: synonym of Cymbiola (Cymbiolacca) pulchra wisemani (Brazier, 1870)
 Cymbiola tamariskae Sutanto & Patamakanthin, 2004: synonym of Cymbiola nobilis tamariskae Sutanto & Patamakanthin, 2004

References

 Bail, P & Poppe, G. T. 2001. A conchological iconography: a taxonomic introduction of the recent Volutidae. Hackenheim-Conchbook, 30 pp, 5 pl.

External links

Volutidae
Gastropod genera